Shirish Kanekar (Devanagari: शिरीष कणेकर) is a Marathi writer, stage performer, from Maharashtra, India. He was a journalist in English news paper. Shirish Kanekar served for  'Indian Express'[2] (1968 to 1980), 'Daily' (1980 to 1982), 'Free Press Journal' (1982 to 1985), and 'Syndicated Press News Agency' (1985 to 1989). He still writes articles in Marathi news papers and performs stage shows.

Shirish Kanekar  is known for his books on cricket, Bollywood movies and humor.

Publications

Books
The following is a partial list of his books:

 इरसालकी
 खटलं आणि खटला
 गाये चला जा
 गोतावळा
 चापलूसकी
 चापटपोळी
 फटकेबाजी
 लगाव बत्ती
 सूरपारंब्या
 चहाटळकी
 साखरफुटाणे
 रहस्यवल्ली l
 मखलाशी
 मनमुराद
 डॉलरच्या देशा
 एकला बोलो रे
 माझी फिल्लमबाजी
 यादोंकी बारात
 पुन्हा यादों की बारात
 गोली मार भेजे मे
 वेचक शिरीष कणेकर
 कटटा
 मी माझं मला (आत्मचरित्र)

Stage shows
The stage shows performed by him,
 माझी फिल्लमबाजी
 फटकेबाजी
 कणेकरी

References
Sources
Kanekar's Blog :http://shireeshkanekar.blogspot.in/
Interview with Avadhoot Gupte in Khupte tithe Gupte https://www.youtube.com/watch?v=eYqusM0n6oQ
http://www.maayboli.com/hitguj/messages/118369/118327.html?1161380086
http://swapnil-bookreviews.blogspot.in/2009/06/makhalashi-book-review.html
Kanekar's Profile: https://web.archive.org/web/20110725140527/http://www.ebmm.org/ShireeshKanekar/ShirishKanekar_Profile.pdf

Notes

Marathi-language writers
Living people
1943 births